Jack Carlson (born May 22, 1987) is an American designer, archaeologist, and rowing coxswain. He is the founder and creative director of the New York-based apparel brand Rowing Blazers. He represented the United States at three World Championships, and won a bronze medal at the 2015 World Rowing Championships in Aiguebelette, France. An archaeologist by training, he is the author of several books and articles.

Early life and education
Carlson grew up in Boston, Massachusetts, and Hampstead, England. He graduated from Georgetown University's School of Foreign Service, where he studied Chinese and Classics. At Georgetown, he was captain of the rowing team. Upon graduating from Georgetown, he was awarded an Allbritton Scholarship for graduate study at Oxford University.

He earned a doctorate in archaeology at Brasenose College, Oxford, where he was also awarded a Clarendon Scholarship. His dissertation, supervised by Dame Jessica Rawson and R.R.R. Smith, was a comparative study of the Roman Empire and the contemporaneous Qin-Han Empire in China. At Oxford, he was a member of both the Oxford University Lightweight Rowing Club and its heavyweight counterpart, Oxford University Boat Club.

Writing and archaeology
Carlson worked as a field archaeologist in Italy at the Etruscan site Poggio Colla, in the Mugello Valley. He is the author of a wide range of academic articles, and his work has appeared in Antiquity, the New England Classical Journal, and Foreign Policy. His other research interests include heraldry and vexillology, and he is the author and illustrator of the book A Humorous Guide to Heraldry.

He is also the author of the book Rowing Blazers, an illustrated book about the jackets traditionally worn by rowers on such occasions as Henley Royal Regatta and their history and traditions. The book launched with events at the Ralph Lauren flagships in New York and London.

Carlson is a Fellow of the Royal Numismatic Society, the Royal Asiatic Society, and The Explorers Club, as well as a life member of the Archaeological Institute of America.

Design career

Carlson is the founder, designer, and creative director of the New York-based apparel and accessories brand Rowing Blazers.

The brand is known for its celebrity clientele and has been featured in Vogue, Esquire, The New York Times, and other publications. GQ described it as "the brand that's saving prep by kicking down its walls," and Men's Journal as "classic British and Ivy League iconography with a post-modern, punk twist." Carlson is known for combining elements from the worlds of tailoring, sportswear, and streetwear in unusual ways, and he has designed collaborations with Seiko, Barbour, Umbro, Sperry Top-Sider, J. Crew, Harry's Bar, the NBA, and FILA.

Beyond his work with Rowing Blazers, Carlson also serves as designer and creative director of American tennis and lifestyle brand Arthur Ashe and two heritage British knitwear brands famously favored by Diana, Princess of Wales: Warm & Wonderful and Gyles & George. In 2022, American handbag brand LeSportsac tapped Carlson to serve as creative director of its premium Arc En Ciel line.

Rowing
Carlson represented the United States in rowing as a coxswain for the U.S. team at the 2011, 2014, and 2015 World Championships. His highest finish came in 2015 with a bronze medal in the lightweight men's eight.

He won both the Head of the Charles and Henley Royal Regatta in 2013. At Henley, his crew won the Britannia Challenge Cup, equalling the record time to the Barrier, which has stood since 1993.

At Oxford, Carlson raced in the winning Lightweight Blue Boat at the 2011 Henley Boat Races and the losing Isis crew at the 2010 Oxford-Cambridge Boat Race, before switching allegiances to Oxford Brookes University Boat Club, where he coxed from 2011 to 2014. Carlson served as head coach of Oriel College Boat Club in 2011-2012 and 2013–2014. Oriel finished Head of the River in Summer Eights in both seasons, defending the Headship in 2012 and bumping Christ Church and Pembroke to recapture the Headship in 2014. He also rowed bow seat in the Brasenose College Boat Club 1st VIII, The Childe of Hale, in 2010; and coxed Brasenose to victory in a 2015 re-enactment of the first ever collegiate rowing race, contested between Brasenose College and Jesus College two hundred years earlier.

Prior to Oxford, Carlson rowed and coxed at Georgetown University, where he served as team captain in 2009, and Buckingham Browne & Nichols School in Cambridge, Massachusetts, where his rowing career began on the Charles River.

References

1987 births
Living people
American male rowers
Coxswains (rowing)
American archaeologists
21st-century American writers
Classical archaeologists
Alumni of Brasenose College, Oxford
Georgetown Hoyas rowers
Walsh School of Foreign Service alumni
American male writers
American expatriates in England
American fashion designers
American fashion businesspeople
World Rowing Championships medalists for the United States
Buckingham Browne & Nichols School alumni